Lurd may refer to:
Lurd, Iran
Liberians United for Reconciliation and Democracy (LURD)